Cliff Watson (1940–2018) was an English professional rugby league footballer.

It may also refer to:

 Clifford Watson, English rugby league footballer who played in the 1960s and 1970s
 Cliff Watson (speedway rider) (1916–1989), Australian international speedway motorcyclist